Noddy's Magic Adventure is a children's educational video game released for the PlayStation in 2000, developed by Mind's Eye Productions and published by BBC Multimedia. The game is based on the character Noddy by Enid Blyton.

External links

2000 video games
Children's educational video games
Europe-exclusive video games
Mind's Eye Productions games
PlayStation (console) games
PlayStation (console)-only games
Single-player video games
Video games developed in the United Kingdom
BBC Multimedia games